Michael Christian Wagner (born 26 July 2000) is a German footballer who plays as a goalkeeper for Regionalliga Bayern club FV Illertissen.

Career
Wagner made his debut for Bayern Munich II in the Regionalliga Bayern on 25 August 2017, coming on as a substitute in the 9th minute for outfielder Resul Türkkalesi against FC Augsburg II, as starting goalkeeper Christian Früchtl was sent off two minutes prior. The away match finished as a 1–5 loss. He made four appearances during the following season, but did not play for the second team during the 2019–20 season. He later made his debut for the team in the 3. Liga on 7 February 2021, starting in a home match against KFC Uerdingen.

On 19 April 2021, it was announced that Wagner would not resign with FC Bayern after spending ten years with the reigning champions and that he intended to join Türkgücü München. No details were provided regarding the term of the contract.

Wagner joined Regionalliga Bayern club FV Illertissen on 2 June 2022.

Career statistics

References

External links
 
 
 

2000 births
Living people
Footballers from Munich
German footballers
Association football goalkeepers
FC Bayern Munich II players
Türkgücü München players
FV Illertissen players
3. Liga players
Regionalliga players